The 2006-07 Utah Jazz season was the team's 33rd in the NBA. They began the season hoping to improve upon their 41-41 output from the previous season.

They managed to improve by 10 games, finishing 51-31, and qualifying for the playoffs. The Jazz met the Houston Rockets in the first round, and defeated them in seven games. Then, they met the Golden State Warriors, who just came off a stunning upset in the First Round, in which they defeated the first-seeded Dallas Mavericks in six games in the Semifinals, but the Jazz swiftly dispatched the Warriors in five games, moving on to the Western Conference Finals for the first time since 1998, when they last made the NBA Finals. However, their playoff run ended with a defeat to the eventual champion San Antonio Spurs in five games. The Spurs would go on to win their fourth NBA Championship after sweeping the Cleveland Cavaliers in that year's NBA Finals. Their Western Finals trip made this the most successful recent Jazz season as of 2022.

Draft picks

Roster

Regular season

Season standings

Record vs. opponents

Game log

Playoffs

|- align="center" bgcolor="#ffcccc"
| 1
| April 21
| @ Houston
| L 75–84
| Williams, Fisher (15)
| Carlos Boozer (12)
| Deron Williams (9)
| Toyota Center18,195
| 0–1
|- align="center" bgcolor="#ffcccc"
| 2
| April 23
| @ Houston
| L 90–98
| Carlos Boozer (41)
| Carlos Boozer (12)
| Deron Williams (7)
| Toyota Center18,206
| 0–2
|- align="center" bgcolor="#ccffcc"
| 3
| April 26
| Houston
| W 81–67
| Carlos Boozer (22)
| Carlos Boozer (12)
| Deron Williams (8)
| EnergySolutions Arena19,911
| 1–2
|- align="center" bgcolor="#ccffcc"
| 4
| April 28
| Houston
| W 98–85
| Deron Williams (25)
| Carlos Boozer (10)
| Deron Williams (7)
| EnergySolutions Arena19,911
| 2–2
|- align="center" bgcolor="#ffcccc"
| 5
| April 30
| @ Houston
| L 92–96
| Carlos Boozer (26)
| Mehmet Okur (9)
| Deron Williams (6)
| Toyota Center18,314
| 2–3
|- align="center" bgcolor="#ccffcc"
| 6
| May 3
| Houston
| W 94–82
| Carlos Boozer (22)
| Okur, Boozer (9)
| Deron Williams (8)
| EnergySolutions Arena19,911
| 3–3
|- align="center" bgcolor="#ccffcc"
| 7
| May 5
| @ Houston
| W 103–99
| Carlos Boozer (35)
| Carlos Boozer (14)
| Deron Williams (14)
| Toyota Center18,307
| 4–3
|-

|- align="center" bgcolor="#ccffcc"
| 1
| May 7
| Golden State
| W 116–112
| Deron Williams (31)
| Carlos Boozer (20)
| Deron Williams (8)
| EnergySolutions Arena19,911
| 1–0
|- align="center" bgcolor="#ccffcc"
| 2
| May 9
| Golden State
| W 127–117 (OT)
| Carlos Boozer (30)
| Mehmet Okur (18)
| Deron Williams (14)
| EnergySolutions Arena19,911
| 2–0
|- align="center" bgcolor="#ffcccc"
| 3
| May 11
| @ Golden State
| L 105–125
| Carlos Boozer (19)
| Carlos Boozer (11)
| Deron Williams (6)
| Oracle Arena20,655
| 2–1
|- align="center" bgcolor="#ccffcc"
| 4
| May 13
| @ Golden State
| W 115–101
| Carlos Boozer (34)
| Carlos Boozer (12)
| Deron Williams (13)
| Oracle Arena20,679
| 3–1
|- align="center" bgcolor="#ccffcc"
| 5
| May 15
| Golden State
| W 100–87
| Boozer, Kirilenko (21)
| Carlos Boozer (14)
| Deron Williams (7)
| EnergySolutions Arena19,911
| 4–1
|-

|- align="center" bgcolor="#ffcccc"
| 1
| May 20
| @ San Antonio
| L 100–108
| Deron Williams (34)
| Carlos Boozer (12)
| Deron Williams (9)
| AT&T Center18,300
| 0–1
|- align="center" bgcolor="#ffcccc"
| 2
| May 22
| @ San Antonio
| L 96–105
| Carlos Boozer (33)
| Carlos Boozer (15)
| Deron Williams (10)
| AT&T Center18,797
| 0–2
|- align="center" bgcolor="#ccffcc"
| 3
| May 26
| San Antonio
| W 109–83
| Deron Williams (31)
| Carlos Boozer (12)
| Deron Williams (8)
| EnergySolutions Arena19,911
| 1–2
|- align="center" bgcolor="#ffcccc"
| 4
| May 28
| San Antonio
| L 79–91
| Deron Williams (27)
| Carlos Boozer (9)
| Deron Williams (10)
| EnergySolutions Arena19,911
| 1–3
|- align="center" bgcolor="#ffcccc"
| 5
| May 30
| @ San Antonio
| L 84–109
| Andrei Kirilenko (13)
| Carlos Boozer (12)
| Carlos Boozer (4)
| AT&T Center18,797
| 1–4
|-

Player statistics

Regular season

|-
| 
| 1 || 0 || 2.0 || . || . || . || .0 || .0 || .0 || .0 || .0
|-
| 
| 28 || 0 || 8.9 || .415 || . || .621 || 2.4 || .4 || .2 || .1 || 2.6
|-
| 
| 74 || 74 || 34.6 || style="background-color:#6BABDD;color:#FFFFFF"| .561 || . || .685 || style="background-color:#6BABDD;color:#FFFFFF"| 11.7 || 3.0 || .9 || .3 || style="background-color:#6BABDD;color:#FFFFFF"| 20.9
|-
| 
| 56 || 14 || 12.1 || .528 || .000 || .675 || 1.3 || .4 || .7 || .1 || 4.6
|-
| 
| 49 || 0 || 9.2 || .327 || .214 || .649 || .8 || 1.7 || .4 || .1 || 1.9
|-
| 
| style="background-color:#6BABDD;color:#FFFFFF"| 82 || 9 || 11.1 || .441 || . || .651 || 2.1 || .7 || .2 || .1 || 2.5
|-
| 
| style="background-color:#6BABDD;color:#FFFFFF"| 82 || 61 || 27.9 || .382 || .308 || .853 || 1.8 ||3.3 || 1.0 || .1 || 10.1
|-
| 
| 61 || 6 || 19.5 || .462 || style="background-color:#6BABDD;color:#FFFFFF"| .426 || .816 || 2.1 || 1.0 || .5 || .1 || 7.8
|-
| 
| 77 || 2 || 25.5 || .491 || .333 || .767 || 4.6 || 1.3 || .7 || .1 || 11.6
|-
| 
| 70 || 70 || 29.3 || .471 || .213 || .728 || 4.7 || 2.9 || style="background-color:#6BABDD;color:#FFFFFF"| 1.1 || style="background-color:#6BABDD;color:#FFFFFF"| 2.1 || 8.3
|-
| 
| 37 || 13 || 10.1 || .345 || .219 || .609 || .9 || .7 || .3 || .1 || 2.7
|-
| 
| style="background-color:#6BABDD;color:#FFFFFF"| 82 || 1 || 18.0 || .525 || .333 || .673 || 5.2 || .8 || .8 || .9 || 6.8
|-
| 
| 80 || style="background-color:#6BABDD;color:#FFFFFF"| 80 || 33.3 || .462 || .384 || .765 || 7.2 || 2.0 || .5 || .5 || 17.6
|-
| 
| 3 || 0 || 4.3 || .000 || .000 || style="background-color:#6BABDD;color:#FFFFFF"| 1.000 || 1.0 || .0 || .0 || .0 || .7
|-
| 
| 80 || style="background-color:#6BABDD;color:#FFFFFF"| 80 || style="background-color:#6BABDD;color:#FFFFFF"| 36.9 || .456 || .322 || .767 || 3.3 || style="background-color:#6BABDD;color:#FFFFFF"| 9.3 || 1.0 || .2 || 16.2
|}

Playoffs

|-
| 
| 5 || 0 || 5.6 || .375 || . || .417 || 2.2 || .2 || .2 || .0 || 2.2
|-
| 
| style="background-color:#6BABDD;color:#FFFFFF"| 17 || style="background-color:#6BABDD;color:#FFFFFF"| 17 || 38.5 || .536 || . || .738 || style="background-color:#6BABDD;color:#FFFFFF"| 12.2 || 2.9 || 1.0 || .3 || style="background-color:#6BABDD;color:#FFFFFF"| 23.5
|-
| 
| 8 || 0 || 5.1 || style="background-color:#6BABDD;color:#FFFFFF"| .600 || . || .538 || .8 || .3 || .1 || .0 || 2.4
|-
| 
| 8 || 0 || 6.5 || .353 || .000 || .250 || .4 || 1.1 || .0 || .0 || 1.6
|-
| 
| 13 || 0 || 8.5 || .333 || . || .529 || 1.5 || .4 || .3 || .0 || 1.2
|-
| 
| 16 || 14 || 27.8 || .405 || .375 || style="background-color:#6BABDD;color:#FFFFFF"| .933 || 1.6 || 2.6 || 1.0 || .1 || 9.5
|-
| 
| style="background-color:#6BABDD;color:#FFFFFF"| 17 || 3 || 18.1 || .418 || style="background-color:#6BABDD;color:#FFFFFF"| .538 || .875 || 1.6 || 1.0 || .2 || .1 || 6.1
|-
| 
| style="background-color:#6BABDD;color:#FFFFFF"| 17 || 0 || 25.5 || .456 || .000 || .723 || 4.8 || 1.4 || .4 || .2 || 9.3
|-
| 
| style="background-color:#6BABDD;color:#FFFFFF"| 17 || style="background-color:#6BABDD;color:#FFFFFF"| 17 || 31.0 || .447 || .333 || .785 || 5.2 || 2.6 || .9 || style="background-color:#6BABDD;color:#FFFFFF"| 2.4 || 9.6
|-
| 
| 1 || 0 || 10.1 || . || . || .500 || .0 || .0 || .0 || .0 || 1.0
|-
| 
| style="background-color:#6BABDD;color:#FFFFFF"| 17 || 0 || 15.5 || .525 || .000 || .667 || 4.4 || .5 || .6 || .5 || 5.9
|-
| 
| style="background-color:#6BABDD;color:#FFFFFF"| 17 || style="background-color:#6BABDD;color:#FFFFFF"| 17 || 34.4 || .388 || .316 || .786 || 7.8 || 1.8 || 1.4 || .9 || 11.8
|-
| 
| style="background-color:#6BABDD;color:#FFFFFF"| 17 || style="background-color:#6BABDD;color:#FFFFFF"| 17 || style="background-color:#6BABDD;color:#FFFFFF"| 38.6 || .452 || .333 || .790 || 4.3 || style="background-color:#6BABDD;color:#FFFFFF"| 8.6 || style="background-color:#6BABDD;color:#FFFFFF"| 1.5 || .2 || 19.2
|}

Awards and records
 Paul Millsap, NBA All-Rookie Team 2nd Team

Transactions

References

Utah Jazz seasons
Utah
Utah
Utah